Puncturella expansa, common name the broad puncturella,  is a species of sea snail, a marine gastropod mollusk in the family Fissurellidae, the keyhole limpets and slit limpets.

Description
The size of the shell varies between 25 mm and 40 mm.

Distribution

References

 Keen M. (1971) Sea shells of tropical West America. Marine mollusks from Baja California to Perú, ed. 2. Stanford University Press. 1064 pp.

External links
 Dall W.H. (1896). Diagnoses of new species of mollusks from the west coast of America. Proceedings of the United States National Museum. 18 [1895]: 7-20.
 To World Register of Marine Species
 

Fissurellidae
Gastropods described in 1896